Beata Uwamaliza  Habyarimana is a Rwandan politician and economist who serves as Minister of Trade and Industry in Rwanda since March 2021.

Education 
Beata pursued Bachelor`s Degree in Finance at the University of Rwanda from 1996 to 2000, and she holds a Masters Degree in Economic Administration from Maastricht University in the Netherlands in 2011.

Career 
Beata she  is an economist of over 15 years of experience in financial sector because before her appointment she was serving as Deputy Managing Director at Bank of Africa. she also worked at Agaseke Bank as CEO, and she served at Banque Populaire du Rwanda (BPR) in senior positions. She had  also previously worked with the Bill and Melinda Gates Foundation.

References 

21st-century Rwandan women politicians
21st-century Rwandan politicians
Rwandan women economists
Living people
Year of birth missing (living people)
Industry ministers of Rwanda
Trade ministers of Rwanda